Dharmapureesvarar Temple is a Hindu temple dedicated to the deity Shiva, located at Vadakandam in Tiruvarur district, Tamil Nadu, India.

Vaippu Sthalam
It is one of the shrines of the Vaippu Sthalams sung by Tamil Saivite Nayanar Appar. This place is also known Thalicchathangudi.

Presiding deity
The presiding deity in the garbhagriha, represented by the lingam, is known as Dharmapureesvarar. The Goddess is known as Swarnambal.

Specialities
Appar praises this place as "Nallore Nandraga" in his hymns. The Sastha (Satthan) temple of this place is very famous. Satthan refers to Thali and hence this place is known so. After visiting Nallur and Pazhayarai the Lord goes around many places. They include Setrur, Thalayalangadu, Peruvelur, Pattiswaram, Manarkkal and reaches Thalicchathangudi. Then he goes to Tiruvarur.

Structure 
This temple has no rajagopura. It has a compound wall. The entrance is facing east. In the facade of the entrance of the temple. stucco figures of Shiva and Parvati are found. Next to the entrance the temple is found with one prakara. Very near to it bali peetam and nandhi mandapa are found. The temple has an entrance in the south also. While going around the prakara shrines of Vinayaka and Subramania with his consorts Valli and Deivanai are found in the west.  After crossing bali peetam and nandhi mandapa, through the inner entrance, garbhagriha could be reached to see the presiding deity. The shrine is facing east. The shrine of goddess, Swarnambal is facing south.  In the kosta Dakshinamurthy, Lingodbhava, Brahma and Durga are found.

Location
The temple is located at Vadakandam in Tiruvarur-Kumbakonam road, at a distance of 7 km from Tiruvarur. As the temple is very to the main road, it could be easily identified. It is opened for worship from 8.00 to 10.30 a.m. and 5.00 to 7.00 p.m.

References

Hindu temples in Tiruvarur district
Shiva temples in Tiruvarur district